Emmer Green is the northernmost suburb of Reading in the English county of Berkshire within the unitary authority, centred  north of the town. Having most of its own commerce, sport and other amenities, Emmer Green has an arbitrary divide with larger Caversham and a border with Oxfordshire, the county in which both places formerly stood.

History
Caversham was the area's ancient parish until the concept was done away with on the partition of England into parished and non-parished areas in the 1860s. Emmer Green has five former mansions. Two are now converted for residential use: Rosehill House and Notley Place. Rosehill House, standing in 14 acres of ground, was once part of Caversham Manor, the first building being erected in 1791. Martin John Sutton, of Sutton's Seeds, lived there, the house then being called Kidmore Grange. In 1923 it was bought for the Oratory Preparatory School; then from the outbreak of the last war until 1958 it accommodated part of The Salvation Army's headquarters as staff were evacuated from central London. The house has since been converted into flats and a housing estate built on the grounds. The third, Caversham Park, is owned by the BBC, while Grove House has become Highdown School. Caversham Place was designed by the architect Clough Williams-Ellis for Major-General Sir Cecil Pereira, whose brother The Rev Edward Thomas Pereira was headmaster and benefactor of The Oratory School.

Geography
Caversham forms a suburban conglomeration (continuous area of development) with Emmer Green. Emmer Green is bordered by the extensive nature reserve at Clayfield Copse and Blackhouse Woods and also by the tip of the Chiltern Hills at Bugs Bottom (also known as Hemdean Bottom). There is a cycle path to Wallingford and access to Balmore Park which overlooks Caversham, with views as far as the Madejski Stadium wind turbine.

Together with Caversham the area is green-buffered by sports fields, agricultural fields or woodland to the north with Rotherfield Peppard and the west with Mapledurham.  Altogether the conglomeration forms three wards, i.e. approximately a fifth of the borough of Reading in terms of population however a higher proportion of the land.

Education
There are two primary schools, Emmer Green Primary School and The Hill Primary which is situated between Emmer Green and Caversham, and the comprehensive Highdown School and Sixth Form Centre which was rated as outstanding by Ofsted in 2010.

Chalk mining
There is at least one disused chalk mine in Emmer Green, referred to as Emmer Green (Hanover) Chalk Mine, with the principal access located at the junction of Peppard Road and Kiln Road (OS Grid Ref: SU722769).

Transport

It is served by three principal bus routes and one community link route. The 24 route runs from Central Reading and serves a circular route round Emmer Green. The 23 route runs from Central Reading and serves a circular route round Caversham Park and the eastern part of Emmer Green. The 25 route runs from Central Reading to Peppard Common in South Oxfordshire. The Community Link 28 operates 3 buses per day between Central Reading and various locations in Caversham Park, Emmer Green and Caversham. Two of these buses reach to Southcote, Tilehurst and Purley on Thames, west of Reading.

Religion
St Barnabas is the local Church of England parish church. The present building was consecrated on 29 June 1929 and the previous nineteenth century church is still in use as a village hall.

Sport

Football: Caversham AFC – Football recreation ground, Emmer Green FC
Rugby: Abbey RFC – Rugby Union playing ground, Peppard Road
Tennis: Caversham Park Tennis Club – Clayfield Copse.

Demography

Nearest places

Notes and references
Notes 
  
References

External links

 Emmer Green Chalk Mine.
 Emmer Green Primary School
 St Barnabas Church

Suburbs of Reading, Berkshire